Sir William Napier Shaw  (4 March 1854 – 23 March 1945) was a British meteorologist. He introduced the tephigram, a diagram for evaluating convective instability in the atmosphere. He also served as president of the International Meteorological Committee and Royal Meteorological Society.

Biography
Shaw was born at 84 Vyse Street in Birmingham the son of Charles Thomas Shaw, a goldsmith and jeweller, and his wife, Kezia Lauden. He was educated at King Edward's School, Birmingham.

He studied at Cambridge University graduating MA in 1876, then at the University of Berlin in Berlin.

Returning to Britain he began as a Demonstrator in Physics at the Cavendish Laboratory linked to Cambridge University in 1879. In 1887 he began lecturing in Experimental Physics. In 1898 he became Assistant Director of the Cavendish Laboratory.

In 1891, he was elected a Fellow of the Royal Society.

In 1900 he became Secretary of the Meteorological Council. From 1905 to 1907 he was Director of the Meteorological Office. In 1907  he became the first Professor of Meteorology at Imperial College, London.

In 1911 he served as President of the International Meteorological Committee, forerunner of the World Meteorological Organization. In 1915, he developed the tephigram. He was knighted by King George V later that year.

He was President of the Royal Meteorological Society 1918/19. In 1933 he was elected an honorary Fellow of the Royal Society of Edinburgh.

Shaw also studied air pollution, and was the first to study and discuss smog and look at its health problems. In 1925, he co-authored the book The Smoke Problem of Great Cities with John Switzer Owens.

Shaw retired in 1924 aged 70 and died in London aged 91.

Family

In 1885 he married Sarah Jane Dugdale Harland (d.1923). They had no children.

Publications

Practical Physics (1893)
Forecasting Weather (1911)
Articles on "Dew", "Fog","Squall" and "Sunshine" in the Encyclopaedia Britannica (1911)
The Smoke Problem of Great Cities (1925)
Manual of Meteorology (1926) plus several later editions

Honours and awards
1910: He was awarded the Symons Gold Medal of the Royal Meteorological Society
1923: He was awarded a Royal Medal by the Royal Society.
1924: He was an Invited Speaker of the ICM in Toronto.

References

External links

 Royal Society c.v.
 Royal Society certificate of election

1854 births
1945 deaths
English meteorologists
Fellows of the Royal Society
Knights Bachelor
People from Birmingham, West Midlands
Presidents of the Royal Meteorological Society
Recipients of the Buys Ballot Medal (Netherlands)
Royal Medal winners
Air pollution in the United Kingdom